Pius Joseph Malip (died 21 November 1988) was a Papua New Guinean politician. He served as a member of the National Parliament from 1987 to 1988.

Biography
Malip contested the Ambunti-Dreikikir Open constituency in the 1987 general elections as an independent candidate and was elected to the National Parliament, defeating the incumbent MP Asimboro Ston. However, he died in Port Moresby on 21 November 1988 following a car accident.

References

Members of the National Parliament of Papua New Guinea
1988 deaths